Come Drink with Me is a 1966 Hong Kong wuxia film produced by Shaw Brothers Studio and directed by King Hu. Set during the Ming Dynasty, it stars Cheng Pei-pei, Yueh Hua and Chan Hung-lit in the leading roles, and features action choreography by Han Ying-chieh.

Considered one of the greatest wuxia films of all time, Come Drink with Me was both a critical and commercial success, and launched the career of Cheng Pei-pei as a star of the wuxia genre. It was selected as the Hong Kong entry for the Best Foreign Language Film at the 39th Academy Awards, but was not nominated.

Plot
Zheng Bi-qiu, a provincial magistrate and the son of the governor, is kidnapped by the bandit Jade-Faced Tiger. Tiger demands Zheng release his imprisoned master, but when the principled man refuses, he instead holds him for ransom: demanding to the Governor that the master be released in five days, or his son will be killed.

The Governor’s other child, a young woman known as Golden Swallow, is sent to rescue her brother. Initially disguised as a man, Golden Swallow is herself an adept swordfighter and martial artist, demonstrating her skills against Tiger's bandits when they confront her at a local inn. 

A local beggar, known as Drunken Cat, acts as Golden Swallow’s guardian angel, covertly saving her from an ambush attempt later that night. When Golden Swallow goes to thank him the next day, he feigns ignorance, appearing only as a hedonistic drunkard collecting scraps with his army of children. However, he covertly communicates the bandits whereabouts via a coded message in a song, describing  the traditional Chinese character meaning temple (廟).

Jade-Faced Tiger’s gang have occupied a local Buddhist monastery with the support of its corrupt abbot, Liao Kung. Golden Swallow penetrates the compound disguised as a parishioner, but is swiftly found out by Jade-Faced Tiger and forced into a confrontation. Despite her skills, she is woefully outnumbered, and narrowly escapes with her life. During the brawl, she is injured by one of Tiger’s poison-tipped darts. She is rescued in the woods by Drunken Cat, who nurses her back to health. 

While she is convalescing, Golden Swallow learns that Drunken Cat is actually Fan Da-pei, a Shaolin master and a leader of the Green Wand Kung Fu school, which he otherwise keeps a secret. Liao Kung is Fan’s blood brother, having him into the martial arts society when he was a starving orphan. Greedy for power, Liao Kung killed their master to take over the school, and sought the valuable bamboo staff that is their symbol, which Fan has obtained. Although Liao Kung claims to be the legitimate heir to the throne, as he was the most senior student, Fan maintains that his murderous deeds have negated that right. However, he is unwilling to fight his blood brother, both out of gratitude for saving his life, and because of Liao’s superior skills.

Fan negotiates a prisoner exchange between Zheng Bi-qiu and the bandits’ master. However, after Bi-qiu is handed released, Fan ambushes the bandits and prevents them from releasing their leader. As the government soldiers march the bandit leader back to prison, the bandits attack the procession. Golden Swallow, leading her female warriors, manages to fight them off, killing all but Jade-Faced Tiger, who is spared at the intervention of Liao Kung. A fight with Fan ensues, and he holds his blood brother and swordpoint, demanding he reform his evil ways in exchange for his life. Liao seemingly agrees, but then later attacks Fan at his house. In their final confrontation, Fan kills Liao with their master’s bamboo staff.

Cast

Production
Come Drink With Me was shot on-location in Taiwan and at the Shaw Brothers Studio in Hong Kong. It was the breakthrough role for actress Cheng Pei-pei, who was only 19 years old at the time of filming. Cheng did not have a martial arts background, but was a trained ballet dancer and choreographer, which director King Hu found conducive to his style of action filmmaking.

Hu told critic Tony Rayns (quoted in Bey Logan's book) that he had deliberately chosen a ballet dancer for the lead female role, "... rather than fighting. I'm very interested in Peking opera and particularly its movement and action effects, although I think it's difficult to express them adequately on stage, where the physical limitations are too great". King Hu was said to recognise that some of the fights are stylised as opposed to realistic but claimed that combat in his movies was "always keyed to the notion of dance".

Jackie Chan is rumoured to have appeared as one of the child singers near the beginning of the film. Lead actress Cheng Pei-pei denied this in the audio commentary to the Hong Kong DVD release of the film. Still, the film is listed among Chan's acting credits on his official website and autobiography.

Reception 
This film was a great success upon its release in Hong Kong and made a star of Cheng Pei-pei and others.

Home video
In 2003, Intercontinental Video Limited (IVL), through Celestial Pictures, released a digitally restored version of this classic film with a new trailer and interviews, including Cheng Pei-pei.

In May 2008, Dragon Dynasty released their own edition with an improved transfer, the original Mandarin mono soundtrack and exclusive supplements, including a newly recorded audio commentary  with Cheng Pei-pei, trailers, and interviews with the cast (Cheng Pei-pei, Yueh Hua) and director King Hu.

Sequel
A sequel, Golden Swallow, was released in 1968. Cheng Pei-pei reprised her role, with Jimmy Wang Yu as her male co-star.

Unproduced remake
Producers Bob and Harvey Weinstein announced in April 2007 that they would invest in movies with Asian themes. One of the movies they announced was a remake of Come Drink with Me, directed by Quentin Tarantino. However, little has been heard of the project since then, and in June 2008, Tarantino announced his next project would be Inglourious Basterds, leaving the status of the remake undisclosed.

See also
 List of submissions to the 39th Academy Awards for Best Foreign Language Film
 List of Hong Kong submissions for the Academy Award for Best Foreign Language Film

References

External links
On a possible sequel
Love HK Film review
Review 
Review
Review
Review
Illustrated Review
 
 

1966 films
1960s action films
1960s martial arts films
1960s fantasy films
Hong Kong martial arts films
Wuxia films
Girls with guns films
Shaw Brothers Studio films
Films directed by King Hu
Films set in the Ming dynasty